Satomura (written: 里村) is a Japanese surname. Notable people with the surname include:

Meiko Satomura (born 1979), Japanese professional wrestler
 (1919–1960), Japanese physicist
 (1510–1552), Japanese poet

Japanese-language surnames